Novak Djokovic defeated Andy Murray in the final, 3–6, 6–1, 6–2, 6–4 to win the men's singles tennis title at the 2016 French Open. It was his first French Open title and twelfth major title overall, completing the career Grand Slam and achieving a non-calendar year Grand Slam. He became the first man since Rod Laver in 1969 to hold all four major titles simultaneously and the first man in history to do so on three different surfaces. Additionally, he spent his 200th week at world number 1 in the ATP rankings and his 100th consecutive week at world number one during the tournament. Djokovic also extended his record for the most ranking points ever held by any player to 16,950.

Stan Wawrinka was the defending champion, but lost in the semifinals to Murray. Murray became the first British man since Bunny Austin in 1937 to reach the final. Murray's run meant he had reached the final of all four majors at least once in his career.

This tournament marked the first time in the 21st century that Roger Federer did not play at a main draw singles major, withdrawing prior to the tournament to avoid "unnecessary [fitness] risk" since he was "still not 100%". Thus, he ended a then-record of 65 consecutive major appearances, extending back to the 2000 Australian Open.

Nine-time champion Rafael Nadal withdrew prior to his third-round match due to a wrist injury for the first time since he debuted in 2005.

Seeds

Qualifying

Draw

Finals

Top half

Section 1

Section 2

Section 3

Section 4

Bottom half

Section 5

Section 6

Section 7

Section 8

References

External links

Main Draw
2016 French Open – Men's draws and results at the International Tennis Federation

Men's Singles
French Open by year – Men's singles